Roger Mancienne (born 12 December 1947) is a politician from Seychelles who has been Speaker of National Assembly of Seychelles since 28 October 2020.

Personal life 
Roger Mancienne was born in Mahé, Seychelles on 12 December 1947. He was the 2015 Vice Presidential nominee for the Seychelles National Party.

References 

1947 births
People from Mahé, Seychelles
Seychelles National Party politicians

Speakers of the National Assembly (Seychelles)
Members of the National Assembly (Seychelles)
Living people